Lim Gan (林根), better known in Hong Kong by his stagename Sai Gwa-Pau (西瓜刨) (7 October 1918 – 12 March 2001) was a Hong Kong film actor who played roles in over 600 movies from the 1950s onwards. His stagename "Watermelon Slice" referred to his prominent protruding upper teeth. Sai Gwa-pau was well known for his comic roles and in particular his role (牙擦苏) in the film series based on the exploits of Wong Fei-hung.

Filmography
 Wong Fei-hung (film series) (:zh:黃飛鴻系列影視)
 Naughty! Naughty!

See also
Osomatsu-kun

References

1918 births
2001 deaths